Louannec is a commune in the Côtes-d'Armor department in Brittany in northwestern France.

Population

The inhabitants are called louannecains in French and louanegad (Louanegiz) in Breton.

Breton language
In 2008, 5.82% of primary school children attended bilingual schools.

Personalities
Saint Ives of Helory, who died in Louannec on 19 May 1303.
Maodez Glanndour (1909-1986), Breton-language poet.

See also
Communes of the Côtes-d'Armor department

References

External links

Official website 
The coat of arms of Louannec (copyrighted) 

Communes of Côtes-d'Armor